The Deputy Governor of Rivers State is the second highest-ranking official in the executive branch of Rivers State, after the Governor. The Constitution of 1999 requires that the gubernatorial nominee of a party select his or her deputy governor running mate after the primary. The Deputy Governor's duties include assisting the Governor and replacing him or her in the case of death, resignation, removal, impeachment, absence or incapacity due to illness.

Since 1999, individuals who have held this office have been members of the PDP. On 11 April 2015, former SSG Ipalibo Banigo was elected the 6th and 1st female Deputy Governor of Rivers State.

Qualifications
As in the case of the Governor, in order to be qualified to be elected as Deputy Governor, a person must:

be at least thirty-five (35) years of age;
be a Nigerian citizen by birth;
be a member of a political party with endorsement by that political party;
have School Certificate or its equivalent.

Election and Tenure
The Deputy Governor is elected through popular vote on a ticket with the Governor for a term of four years. They may be re-elected for a second term but may not serve for more than two consecutive terms.

List of Deputy Governors

See also
Governor of Rivers State
List of Governors of Rivers State

References

External links

 
Executive Council of Rivers State
Lists of Rivers State politicians